Statistics of Primera División Uruguaya for the 1933 season.

Overview
It was contested by 10 teams, and Nacional won the championship.

League standings

Playoff: Nacional-Peñarol 0-0, 0-0 and 3-2

References
Uruguay - List of final tables (RSSSF)

Uruguayan Primera División seasons
Uru
1933 in Uruguayan football